Goshen Township is one of the sixteen townships of Belmont County, Ohio, United States. The 2010 census reported a population of 3,147 people in the township, 1,438 of whom lived in the unincorporated portions of the township.

Geography
Located in the central part of the county, it borders the following townships:
Union Township - north
Richland Township - northeast
Smith Township - east
Wayne Township - south
Somerset Township - southwest corner
Warren Township - west
Kirkwood Township - northwest

Two villages are located in Goshen Township: Belmont in the north, and Bethesda in the center.

Name and history
Goshen Township was settled about 1801 by settlers from Virginia, Pennsylvania and Ireland. These settlers probably named their new township after a Goshen Township in Chester County, Pennsylvania.

Goshen Township was described in 1833 as having several gristmills and saw mills, three or four fulling mills and carding machines.

It is one of seven Goshen Townships statewide.

Government
The township is governed by a three-member board of trustees, who are elected in November of odd-numbered years to a four-year term beginning on the following January 1. Two are elected in the year after the presidential election and one is elected in the year before it. There is also an elected township fiscal officer, who serves a four-year term beginning on April 1 of the year after the election, which is held in November of the year before the presidential election. Vacancies in the fiscal officership or on the board of trustees are filled by the remaining trustees.

References

External links
County website

Townships in Belmont County, Ohio
Townships in Ohio